CPG may stand for:

Organizations
 Cameron Pace Group, a 4D technology and production company based in Berlin, Germany
 Catholic Police Guild, of England & Wales, founded in 1914
 Center for the Prevention of Genocide at the United States Holocaust Memory Museum
 Central People's Government, term used for the government of the People's Republic of China
 Chingwin Publishing Group, a Taiwanese Publishing Group famous for its large manga selection
 CITIC Publishing Group, a publishing company under CITIC Group based in Beijing, China
 Communist Party of Greece
 Compagnie des phosphates de Gafsa, a Tunisian mining company
 CPG Corporation, the corporatized entity of the former Public Works Department of Singapore
 CPI Property Group, a Luxembourg-based property company

Science
 Caffeoyl phenylethanoid glycoside, a type of phenolic compound (see for instance Verbascoside)
 Calorically perfect gas
Clopidogrel
 CpG ODN, a synthetic TLR9 agonist
 CpG site, a site in DNA
 CpG island, a specialized region of DNA
 Central pattern generator, a neural oscillator, for example generating the respiratory cycle
 abbreviation for Calopogon, an orchid genus containing the "grass pinks"
 Catalog of Principal Galaxies, see Principal Galaxies Catalogue
 Controlled Porosity Glass or Controlled Pore Glass, synonyms for porous glass
 Clavis Patrum Graecorum, volumes published by Brepols of Turnhout in Belgium

Other uses
 Canadian Parliamentary Guide
 Check Point GO, encrypted USB flash drive
 Chrysler Proving Grounds
 Clinical practice guideline
 Codices Palatini germanici, German-language manuscripts in the Palatine library in Heidelberg
 CPG 359, the Cod. Pal. germ. 359 illustrated manuscript
 Consumer packaged goods, another name for fast-moving consumer goods
 ICAO airline designator for Corporacion Aeroangeles, Mexico
 CPg, a Hungarian punk rock band